Bhaag Milkha Bhaag is a 2013 Hindi-language biographical sports drama film directed by Rakeysh Omprakash Mehra, written by lyricist Prasoon Joshi and produced by Viacom 18 Motion Pictures in association with Rajiv Tandon and editor P.S. Bharathi under the ROMP Pictures banner. Based on the life of Milkha Singh, an Indian athlete and Olympian who was a champion of the Commonwealth Games and two-time 400m champion of the Asian Games. it stars Farhan Akhtar in the titular role alongside Divya Dutta, Meesha Shafi, Pavan Malhotra, Yograj Singh, Art Malik, and Prakash Raj in supporting roles with Sonam Kapoor in an extended cameo appearance. Sports was coordinated by the American action director Rob Miller of ReelSports.

It performed very well at the box office, eventually being declared a "super hit" domestically as well as a hit overseas. Bhaag Milkha Bhaag is the sixth highest-grossing 2013 Bollywood film worldwide and became the 21st film to gross .

Bhaag Milkha Bhaag was inspired by The Race of My Life, an autobiography co-written by Singh and his daughter, Sonia Sanwalka. Singh sold the film rights for one rupee and inserted a clause stating that a share of the profits would be given to the Milkha Singh Charitable Trust, which was founded in 2003 with the aim of assisting poor and needy sportspeople.

Plot
The film starts in the 1960 Summer Olympics in Rome, in which Milkha Singh is competing in the 400-metre. His coach yells "Bhaag Milkha Bhaag!" ("Run, Milkha, run!"), and Singh is suddenly taken back to the memories of his childhood which haunt him, resulting in him dropping to fourth place. His memories are full of the chaos surrounding the 1947 Partition of India, which resulted in mass religious violence in Punjab and the killing of Singh's parents. The flashback shows Singh reaching Delhi alone, where he later meets his sister. Living in impoverished refugee camps, Milkha makes friends and survives by stealing with them. Now grown up, he falls in love with Biro, who asks him to live a life of honesty.

Milkha soon finds himself in the army. There, he wins a race in which the top 10 runners are rewarded milk, two eggs, and are excused from fatigue duty; his running skills are noticed by a havaldar (sergeant). He gets selected for service commission, where he is miffed. On the day before selection of the Indian team for the Olympics, Singh is beaten up by senior players whom he had defeated earlier. Despite being injured, he participates in the race and overcomes his pain; he wins the race and breaks the national record. Proud of his achievement, Milkha goes back to Delhi to ask Biro's hand in marriage. However, his friend informs him that Biro was married and left Delhi.

During the Melbourne 1956 Olympics, Singh is attracted to Stella, the granddaughter of his Australian technical coach. After a frolicking night in a bar, they have a one-night stand. The following day, he feels exhausted from the night's activities and loses the final race. He realises his mistake and, suffering from guilt, he even slaps himself in front of a mirror. On the flight back to India, he asks his coach what the world record is for the 400m race and learns that it is 45.9 seconds. A montage of tyre training in the cold desert of the Himalayas is depicted, wherein Milkha Singh pushes himself to the brink of absolute exhaustion. He subsequently enters the 1958 Asian Games with the hope of winning Gold for India. He then sees Abdul Khaliq, dubbed the "Fastest Man of Asia". After Abdul wins his race, Milkha Singh approaches him to congratulate the victor. However, the Pakistani coach and his athlete shun and disrespect him. But in the 200m, he defeats Khaliq by a considerable margin. Moving to the Commonwealth Games, he wins another Gold in the 400m and is named "The King of England" by various newspapers. After celebrating his victory along with his teammates in the army, he burns the paper on which the time of 45.9 seconds was written, indicating that he was ready to break the world record of 400m. He finally achieves his life-long dream by breaking the 400m world record.

Invited by the prime minister of India, Jawaharlal Nehru, to lead the Indian team in Pakistan for a friendly race with Abdul Khaliq, Singh adamantly refuses to go due to the trauma of having to flee his home in the newly formed Pakistan as a child. The prime minister learns of Singh's opposition but ultimately convinces him to go. Arriving in Pakistan, Singh misses the press conference and goes to his village where, in a flashback, it is shown how his parents were murdered and the last words of his father were "Bhaag Milkha Bhaag!". He starts crying and is comforted by a boy who turns out to be the son of his childhood friend, Sampreet. He then meets Sampreet, who evidently survived the chaos of partition.

In the games, initially, Khaliq is winning, but Singh takes the lead after overtaking opponents one by one. Impressed how easily Singh passed the Pakistani athlete and won by a humongous margin, the president of Pakistan, General Ayub Khan, gives him the title of "The Flying Sikh". Jawaharlal Nehru declares a day in the name of Milkha as a national holiday as requested by Singh himself. A final sequence of Milkha Singh is depicted where he is enjoying his victory lap and everybody in the stadium is in awe of what he has achieved. He sees his younger self running beside him, as the film ends.

Cast

 Farhan Akhtar as Subedar Milkha Singh
 Japtej Singh as Little Milkha
 Divya Dutta as Isri Kaur, Milkha's elder sister
 Meesha Shafi as Perizaad
 Pavan Malhotra as Havaldar Gurdev Singh, Milkha's coach during his days in the Indian Army
 Yograj Singh as Ranveer Singh, Milkha's coach
 Art Malik as Sampooran Singh, Milkha's father
 Prakash Raj as Veerapandian
 K.K.Raina as Mr. Wadhwa
 Rebecca Breeds as Stella
 Dalip Tahil as Jawaharlal Nehru
 Shanta Kumar as Gen. Ayub Khan
 Dev Gill as Abdul Khaliq
 Nawab Shah as Khaliq's coach
 Jass Bhatia as Mahinder
 Salim Zaidi as Pakistani reporter
 Sumit Gulati as Suresh Kumar
 Mahendra Mewati as Kirpal Singh
 Rupinder Singh athletics consultant
 Chandan Singh Gill as Sampreet Singh, Milkha's childhood friend
 Preity Üpala as the Journalist
 Sonam Kapoor as Biro Kaur, Milkha's fleeting love interest (extended cameo appearance)
 Loy Mendonsa in a special appearance as the country singer in the song "Slow Motion Angreza"

Production

Development
After the release of Delhi-6 (2009), director Rakeysh Omprakash Mehra started developing two projects: a historical love story, Mirza Sahiban, and a biopic of Milkha Singh. He chose the latter as it had developed better. Prasoon Joshi, who co-wrote Delhi-6 with Mehra, started working on the script. Joshi later clarified that the film's title, Bhaag Milkha Bhaag (Run Milkha Run) was never actually spoken by Milkha's father. Rather, it was a phrase coined by him and was used liberally throughout the narrative.

Growing up in Delhi, Mehra was familiar with anecdotes from the life of Milkha Singh, the ace runner popular as the "Flying Sikh". He used to visit the National Stadium, Delhi for swimming, where Singh also came for his practice. Gradually, he learns details regarding his early life, including how he witnessed his entire family being killed during the Partition and travelled alone to Delhi as a refugee. Mehra started developing the project as a personal story rather than a sports film, taking the theme of "zindagi se bhago nahin, zindagi ke saath bhago" ("don't run away from life, run with life"), depicting his life from 13 to 28 years.

For research, he visited Chandigarh several times, where he talked for hours with Singh. Milkha Singh's son, Jeev Milkha Singh, a notable golfer in his own right, arranged his meetings with the family members.

It took the next two and half years to write the story. According to the director, it is not a sports film, but a film about human spirit.

Casting
In 2010, early contenders of the lead role were Abhishek Bachchan and Akshay Kumar. While Bachchan was preferred by Mehra, Kumar was preferred by Milkha Singh himself. Mehra, however, deferred the final decision on the cast till the final script was completed. After months of searching, in September 2011, the principal cast were announced. Actor-director Farhan Akhtar and actress Sonam Kapoor received the lead roles. Thereafter, Akhtar visited Punjab to meet Milkha Singh and his family. Before deciding, Akhtar met Mehra once for a story session and immediately agreed to play the role. He was inspired by Milkha Singh's life and underwent extensive physical training for the role.

Pakistani actress and singer, Meesha Shafi—who rose to fame with her song "Alif Allah (Jugni)", played RAW agent in the hit Pakistani film Waar, and in 2013 made her Hollywood debut with The Reluctant Fundamentalist—was selected for the role of Perizaad, Singh's friend and a swimmer for team India.

Filming
The principal photography commenced in February 2012 and mainly took place in Punjab, India, with some scenes shot in Delhi, Tokyo, Melbourne, and Rome.

International company ReelSports coordinated the sports action for Bhaag Milkha Bhaag and cast all the elite runners.

Soundtrack

The music and the background score were composed by Shankar–Ehsaan–Loy, their first film collaboration with Rakeysh Omprakash Mehra. The soundtrack features seven tracks with lyrics written by Prasoon Joshi. The audio was released by Sony Music on 14 June 2013, on digital platforms including iTunes and Amazon.

Release
Bhaag Milkha Bhaag's teaser trailer was released along with Yeh Jawaani Hai Deewani, which released on 31 May 2013.

Bhaag Milkha Bhaag released on 12 July 2013 in 1200 screens worldwide including 140 screens in USA.

That summer, the film received various tax exemptions from Indian state governments:
 On July 20, the governments of Maharashtra and Madhya Pradesh granted an entertainment tax exemption to Bhaag Milkha Bhaag.
 On July 24, the Delhi government also announced a tax exemption.
 On July 25, Goa's government gave tax-free status to the film for three months.
 On July 29, the Haryana government made the film tax-free in the state.
 On August 1, Uttar Pradesh government approved a proposal to exempt Bhaag Milkha Bhaag from entertainment tax in two instalments or for a maximum of two months.

Farhan Akhtar and director Rakeysh Omprakash Mehra launched the film's official mobile game at the Reliance Digital electronics store in Times Square on 3 August 2013.

Critical response

India
The film received mostly positive reviews from critics domestically.

Bollywood Hungama's Taran Adarsh predicted that it would "win accolades, admiration, respect and esteem, besides emerging as a champ", while Emirates 24/7 's Sneha May Francis gave a thumbs up, saying that the film is "truly epic" and that "despite the prestigious Olympic glory eluding him, Mehra deservedly honors the runner's other victories and impeccable talent, allowing us to applaud the prodigy." Desimartini, with almost 5000 ratings by the end of the weekend, stated the following: "Superbly directed, Bhaag Milkha Bhaag is an outstanding film with an incredible performance by Farhan Akhtar. Though long, it keeps you hooked throughout. Don't miss this patriotic tribute to Milkha Singh."

Madhureeta Mukherjee of The Times of India stated, "While you are on-the-run, pause to watch this one." The India Today review concluded, "Go and run with Milkha. In this fast-paced life, this race will definitely soothe your senses." Sify's Vijay Sinha praised the film, judging "Bhaag Milkha Bhaag should get even drug-addled Punjab flocking to the cinemas." Gayatri Sankar of Zee News wrote, "If you are a patriotic Indian, you will be left teary-eyed and your head held high." Yahoo! Movies' review summed up, "Mehra has helmed 'Bhaag Milkha Bhaag' into a compelling story and an exemplar of cinematic brilliance; that it is also an inspiring tale almost seems to be a by-product."

Aseem Chhabra of Rediff.com gave a mixed review and reasoned that film does not offer anything new. However, he praised Akhtar's performance, writing "If there is one reason to see BMB it is to watch Akhtar – how much he has evolved as an actor and the sincerity with which he immerses himself in the character." NDTV echoed the same sentiment, "Bhaag Milkha Singh is a 400 meters sprint that feels like a cross-country race." Despite praising the technical aspects and music, Rajeev Masand of CNN-IBN criticised the length: "The film itself is well intentioned and shines a light on an important figure. The film is an ambitious account of the first 27 years or so of celebrated Indian sprinter Milkha Singh's roller-coaster life. But it's too long and too unfocused to leave a lasting impression."

Actor Hrithik Roshan praised Akhtar's performance and deemed the film to be "phenomenal." Veteran actor Amitabh Bachchan highly praised it on his blog, describing it as "too emotionally and creatively moving to put anything down in words."

International
American athlete Carl Lewis watched Bhaag Milkha Bhaag in the US and called Milkha Singh in India to express his appreciation for the film and the athlete.

Robert Abele of the Los Angeles Times described the film as "a stirring bio of Milkha Singh", as well as stating that there's enough dramatic restraint and performance charm to give Singh his due as a justifiably glorified figure in post-independence India.

Nicolas Rapold of The New York Times said that "the movie strikes its chosen couple of notes resoundingly, making clear what makes Singh run." Twitch Film's review said that, "in the grand scheme of things, Bhaag Milkha Bhaag is easily one of the best mainstream films to come out of Bollywood this year." Scott Foundas of Variety described it as a "rousing and handsomely crafted biopic". Lisa Tsering of The Hollywood Reporter opined that the biopic "requires viewer endurance, but pays off with an exhilarating climax." Digital Spy praised the work and said, "It is a blessing that this film was made and the inspiring story of India's greatest sporting hero told to a generation who might otherwise never have known the legend of 'The Flying Sikh.'"

The Washington Post stated that the Bollywood import dramatises the life of famed Indian sprinter Milkha Singh.

Box office
Bhaag Milkha Bhaag grossed  worldwide and is the fifth highest-grossing 2013 Bollywood film.

India
In India, the film has netted a total .

The film opened very well at multiplexes across India, especially in Punjab and Delhi. The film:
 grossed approximately  nett over its first weekend, and earned a total of  nett on Monday.
 grossed  nett over its first four days.
 ended its first week with a total collection of approximately  nett.
 collected around  nett on its eighth day.
 collected  nett on its second Saturday.
 earned approximately  nett over a ten-day period.
 grossed over  nett in 17 days as it grossed around  nett in its third weekend.
 grossed  nett in 24 days as it added around  nett in its fourth weekend.

Overseas
Bhaag Milkha Bhaag grossed around $1.4 million over its first weekend overseas. The film grossed  in its first week of release in the United States, and debuted at the 15th spot at the box office. It has done well overseas with collections of around $2.7 million. The film has done well in US. It has done overseas business of over US$3.5 million and has been declared a hit. The final overseas business is around US$3.8 million.

Controversy
The film's song "Maston Ka Jhund" landed into controversy after a right-wing Hindu organisation, Hindu Janajagruti Samiti (HJS), took objection to the use of the word "havan" in the song. They alleged that havan (Yagya) has been used in a derogatory manner. Their reference is to the allegedly 'obscene' actions that the actors performed on the song. Demonstrations were held in Goa regarding the issue.

Certain members of the Central Board of Film Certification (CBFC) boycotted a workshop held in accordance with the Information and Broadcast Ministry's wish citing partially of some officials of the censor board particularly regarding the certificate given to Bhaag Milkha Bhaag which, in spite of a sex scene and some violence, got a U certificate lashing out and criticising the decisions of the censor examining member and former actress, Sharmila Tagore accusing CEO Pankaja Thakur along with some other board officials being puppets controlled by film directors and promoting vulgarity.

As a consequence, the Delhi High Court sought an explanation from the I&B ministry and the CBFC regarding the escalating levels of vulgarity in recent times.

Factual errors
Although the story mentions that Milkha Singh held the men's 400-meter world record, the men's 400 metres world record progression does not mention Milkha Singh's name in the world record holders. It is shown that Ranbir Singh (Milkha's coach) mentions world record as 45.9 seconds after 1952 Olympics; while Milkha eventually bested that time in the 1956 Olympics with a personal record of 45.73 seconds, the newest world record was 45.2 seconds set by Lou Jones of the United States, the first-place winner in the same race.

Gurbachan Singh Randhawa, renowned athlete, who was part of the Indian team at Rome Olympics mentions that the claim made in the movie about Milkha Singh leading the 400-meter race and he lost it as he looked behind, is incorrect. He never led the race and he was at a fifth position at 300 meters.

In the final race when Milkha Singh's sister tunes in the radio to follow the live developments in Milkha's competition, the radio commentator can be heard as announcing, "It seems that entire Pakistan has settled inside the Gaddafi Stadium in Lahore." The Lahore Stadium, which was originally built in 1959, was not renamed as Gaddafi Stadium until 1974.

A Malaysian flag is shown in a scene during Milkha's 1956 competition in Melbourne, however the Malaysian flag did not exist until 1957.

Though the film is set in the 1950s, Milkha is heard singing the song "Nanha munna rahi hoon." The song, however, is from the film Son of India, which was released in 1962.

Accolades

See also
 Gold
 Paan Singh Tomar
 Mary Kom
 Azhar
 M.S. Dhoni: The Untold Story

Notes

References

External links
 
 
 
 Bhaag Milkha Bhaag official Facebook page
 Bhaag Milkha Bhaag official Google Plus page
 Bhaag Milkha Bhaag official YouTube page
 Bhaag Milkha Bhaag official Twitter page

2010s Hindi-language films
Sports films based on actual events
Biographical films about sportspeople
Indian biographical drama films
Athletics films
Indian sports drama films
Films set in the partition of India
Films set in the 1950s
Films set in the 1960s
Films about the 1956 Summer Olympics
Films about the 1960 Summer Olympics
Films about Olympic track and field
Films shot in Punjab, India
Films shot in Delhi
Films shot in Melbourne
Films shot in Tokyo
Films shot in Rome
Films set in Punjab, India
Films set in Lahore
Films set in Punjab, Pakistan
Films set in Pakistan
Indian nonlinear narrative films
Hindi-language films based on actual events
Best Popular Film Providing Wholesome Entertainment National Film Award winners
Films featuring a Best Choreography National Film Award-winning choreography
Viacom18 Studios films
Cultural depictions of track and field athletes
Cultural depictions of Indian men
Cultural depictions of Jawaharlal Nehru
India–Pakistan relations in popular culture
Films directed by Rakeysh Omprakash Mehra
Indian films based on actual events
Indian Army in films
Military of Pakistan in films
2013 biographical drama films
2013 films
2013 drama films
Films based on autobiographies
Olympic Games in fiction